Clare Richards may refer to:
A pen name of the authors Carolyn Males and Louise Titchener.
Claire Richards, an English singer-songwriter and dancer.